France national field hockey team may refer to:
 France men's national field hockey team
 France women's national field hockey team